The Norwegian Media Authority is a Norwegian government agency subordinate to the Ministry of Culture and Equality charged with various tasks relating to broadcasting, newspapers and films. It enforces rules on content, advertising and sponsorship for broadcast media, administers newspaper production grants and enforces rules on media ownership. Prior to 2023 the authority also classifed movies.

Activities

The authority's tasks include 

 enforcing rules on content, advertising and sponsorship for broadcast media; handling license applications for local broadcast media
 handling applications for newspaper production grants for non-leading newspapers, minority language newspapers and Sami newspapers
 overseeing and intervening against the acquisition of media ownership (either prohibiting the acquisition or merger, or allowing an acquisition on such conditions as the Authority sets, including ordering the divestment of other media ownership interests.

History

The agency was established 1 January 2005 by merging three government agencies:
 Norwegian Board of Film Classification (Statens filmtilsyn), which was in charge of rating movies.
 Norwegian Media Ownership Authority (Eierskapstilsynet), which oversaw media ownership.
 Mass Media Authority (Statens medieforvaltning, SMF), which had tasks related to broadcasting and newspapers.

The new authority was located in Fredrikstad from 20 March 2006, where the Mass Media Authority already was located, but in a new building.

In 2003, the agency was moved from Oslo to Fredrikstad from 20 March 2006, where the Mass Media Authority had been located. This was a program along with six other directorates and inspectorates which were move out of Oslo, which had been initialized by Victor Norman, Minister of Government Administration and Reform of the Conservative Party. It cost 729 million Norwegian krone (NOK) to move the seven agencies. An official report from 2009 concluded that the agencies had lost 75 to 90% of their employees, mostly those with long seniority, and that for a while critical functions for society were dysfunctional. No costs reductions had been made, there was no significant impact on the target area, and there was little impact on the communication between the agencies and the ministries. In a 2010 report, Professor Jarle Trondal concluded that none of the agencies had become more independent after the move, despite this being one of the main arguments from the minister. Norman successor, Heidi Grande Røys of the Socialist Left Party, stated that the moving had had an important symbolic effect on the target areas, and that she did not see the lack of advantages as a reason to not move similar agencies later.

The first director of the agency was Tom Thoresen, who was succeeded in 2017 by Mari Velsand.

References

External links 

 
 Film ratings database
 Local television licenses
 Local radio licenses
 The Media Directory—who owns what in Norwegian media

Media Authority
Regulation in Norway
Communications authorities
Entertainment rating organizations
2005 establishments in Norway
Companies based in Fredrikstad
Government agencies established in 2005